Literaturoper (literature opera, plural “Literaturopern”), a term coined by the German music critic Edgar Istel, describes a genre of opera that emerged during the late 19th century. When an existing play for the legitimate theatre is set to music without major changes and without the intervention of a librettist, a “Literaturoper” is the result. Although the term is German, it can be applied to any kind of opera, irrespective of style or language. (In that sense it can be regarded as a term rather than a genre as such.)

The former, much broader usage of the term “Literaturoper” for opera libretti on the basis of dramas, novels and short stories of undoubted literary renown, which was still common until around 1980, has been made obsolete by recent research on the history of the opera libretto. Since opera libretti have relied on subject matter from the history of literature since the very origin of the genre of opera, a broader usage of the term would cover the entire history of opera, regardless of the underlying libretto structure.

Current definition 
According to a seminal publication by Peter Petersen, the term means „a special form of music theater in which the libretto is based on a literary work whose linguistic, semantic and aesthetic structure remains recognizable in the musical-dramatic work as a structural layer.“

History 
The tradition of literaturoper only became established in European opera culture when, with Richard Wagner and the "through-composed dramatic form" he developed, the conventions of verse metrics for the opera libretto had faded. At the same time, the personal union of libretto poet and composer appeared as the new norm of opera production. Especially in the area of the Romance languages, the alliterating verse in Wagner's Ring des Nibelungen was perceived as prose text, since the use of alliteration as basis for the poetry in the Ancient Germanic languages had always been alien the syllable-counting verse systems in the French, Italian, Spanish and Portuguese poetic tradition.

Since the production of literaturopern possessed the potential to make the function of the opera librettist redundant, the genre was first able to assert itself in those opera cultures in which professional libretto-writing had not been able to develop a centuries-long tradition (Russia, Germany). The first examples of this dramaturgical process can be found in the history of French and Russian music in the second half of the 19th century. Early Russian literaturopern include Alexander Dargomyzhsky’s opera  The Stone Guest (after Alexander Pushkin) and Modest Mussorgsky’s opera fragment The Marriage and his  Boris Godunov (also after Pushkin).

In French and Italian opera, which had possessed an established libretto tradition for centuries, the introduction of the literaturoper took place parallel to the discussions about the possibility of writing opera libretti in prose. Since the Italian tradition of operatic verse proved to be particularly resistant to the introduction of prose libretti, the first Italian literaturopern were created on the basis of Gabriele d'Annunzio’s verse dramas (Alberto Franchetti, La figlia di Iorio (1906), Pietro Mascagni, Parisina (1913), Riccardo Zandonai, Francesca da Rimini (1914), Ildebrando Pizzetti, Fedra (1915).

The first composers to directly set plays include Charles Gounod, Pietro Mascagni, Claude Debussy, Richard Strauss and Alban Berg. After the Second World War, the genre flourished, especially in Germany, and composers often resorted to setting plays from previous centuries or from Greek Antiquity. The production of literary operas continues to this day.

Literaturopern based on plays 
 Modest Musorgsky
 The Marriage after Alexander Pushkin's play, 1868 (unfinished)
  Boris Godunov after Alexander Pushkin's play, 1874
 Alexander Dargomyzhsky
   The Stone Guest (Каменный гость) after Alexander Pushkin's play of the same name, 1872
 Charles Gounod:
 George Dandin, after the comedy George Dandin by Molière, unfinished (?), 1874
 Pietro Mascagni:
  Guglielmo Ratcliff after Heinrich Heine in the Italian translation by Andrea Maffei, 1895
  Parisina after Gabriele d’Annunzio, 1913
 Claude Debussy: Pelléas et Mélisande after Maurice Maeterlinck, 1902
 Richard Strauss:
 Salome after Oscar Wilde, 1905
 Elektra after Hugo von Hofmannsthal, 1909
 Alberto Franchetti:
  La figlia di Iorio after Gabriele d’Annunzio, 1906
 Nadia Boulanger / Raoul Pugno, La ville morte after the drama La città morta by Gabriele d’Annunzio, composed 1914, first performance 2008
 Riccardo Zandonai:
 Francesca da Rimini after Gabriele d’Annunzio, 1914
 Ildebrando Pizzetti:
  Gigliola  after Gabriele d’Annunzio’s drama La fiaccola sotto il moggio (1914, unfinished)
  Fedra after Gabriele d’Annunzio, 1915
  La figlia di Iorio after Gabriele d’Annunzio, 1954
  Assassinio nella cattedrale after Thomas Stearns Eliot in der Übersetzung von Alberto Castelli, 1958
 Alexander von Zemlinsky: Eine florentinische Tragödie after Oscar Wilde, 1917
 Italo Montemezzi:
  La nave after Gabriele d’Annunzio, 1918
 Domenico Alaleona:
  after the tragedy by Vittorio Alfieri, 1920
 Sergei Prokofiev: The Love for Three Oranges after Carlo Gozzi’s fiaba teatrale L'amore delle tre melarance , 1921
 Darius Milhaud, Les Euménides after the drama The Eumenides by Aischylos, composed 1917–1922, performed 1949
 Paul Hindemith
 Mörder, Hoffnung der Frauen after the drama  Mörder, Hoffnung der Frauen (1907) by Oskar Kokoschka, 1921
 Sancta Susanna after the drama  Sancta Susanna (1913) by August Stramm, 1922
 The Long Christmas Dinner after the play The Long Christmas Dinner (1931) by Thornton Wilder, 1963
 Alban Berg:
 Wozzeck after Georg Büchner’s Woyzeck, 1925
 Lulu after Frank Wedekind’s plays  Erdgeist and  Die Büchse der Pandora  , 1937
 Manfred Gurlitt:
 Wozzeck after Georg Büchner’s Woyzeck, 1926
 Soldaten after the drama Die Soldaten (Lenz) by Jakob Michael Reinhold Lenz, 1930
 Arthur Honegger
 Antigone (Honegger) after Jean Cocteau, 1927
 Othmar Schoeck:
 Penthesilea after Heinrich von Kleist’s drama Penthesilea (Kleist) (1808), 1927
 Franco Alfano
 Cyrano de Bergerac  after Edmond Rostand, 1936
 Bohuslav Martinů
  Julietta after the play Juliette, ou La clé des songes by Georges Neveux, 1935
 Mirandolina after Carlo Goldoni's 1751 comedy La locandiera, 1959.
 Ariane after the play Le Voyage de Thésée ( 1943) by Georges Neveux, 1961
 Francis Poulenc:
 Les mamelles de Tirésias  after Guillaume Apollinaire, 1941
 La voix humaine after Jean Cocteau, 1958
 Carl Orff:
 Antigonae after the drama by Sophokles in the German translation by Friedrich Hölderlin (1804), 1949
  after the drama by Sophokles in the German translation by Friedrich Hölderlin (1804), 1959
 Prometheus after the drama by Aischylos, 1968
 Werner Egk:
 Irische Legende after The Countess Cathleen by William Butler Yeats, 1955
 Der Revisor after the comedy  The Government Inspector (Ревизор) by Nikolai Gogol, 1957
 Siebzehn Tage und vier Minuten after the comedy El mayor encanto, amor by Pedro Calderón de la Barca, 1966
 Wolfgang Fortner:
 Bluthochzeit after Bodas de sangre by Federico García Lorca, 1957
 In seinem Garten liebt Don Perlimplin Belisa after Amor de don Perlimplín con Belisa en su jardín by Federico García Lorca, 1962
 That Time after the play That Time by Samuel Beckett, 1967
 Benjamin Britten: A Midsummer Night's Dream after William Shakespeare, 1960
 Hans Werner Henze:
 Das Wundertheater after El retablo de las maravillas by Miguel de Cervantes, 1949
 König Hirsch after the „fiaba teatrale“ Il Re cervo (1762) by Carlo Gozzi, 1956
 Der Prinz von Homburg after the drama Prinz Friedrich von Homburg oder die Schlacht bei Fehrbellin by Heinrich von Kleist, 1960
 Die Bassariden after the drama Βάκχαι (The Bacchae) by Euripides, 1966
 Bernd Alois Zimmermann: Die Soldaten after the drama Die Soldaten (Lenz) by Jakob Michael Reinhold Lenz, 1965
 Gottfried von Einem:
 Dantons Tod after the drama Dantons Tod by Georg Büchner, 1947
 Der Besuch der alten Dame after the tragicomedy Der Besuch der alten Dame by Friedrich Dürrenmatt, 1971
 Kabale und Liebe after the play Kabale und Liebe by Friedrich Schiller, 1976
 Boris Blacher:
 Romeo und Julia after the tragedy by William Shakespeare, 1950
 Preußisches Märchen after the comedy Der Hauptmann von Köpenick by Carl Zuckmayer, 1952
 Yvonne, Prinzessin von Burgund after Witold Gombrowicz, 1973
 Giselher Klebe:
 Die Räuber after the tragedy by Friedrich Schiller, 1957
 Die Ermordung Cäsars after Julius Caesar (play) by William Shakespeare, 1959
 Alkmene after  by Heinrich von Kleist, 1961
 Figaro lässt sich scheiden after the comedy Figaro lässt sich scheiden by Ödön von Horváth, 1963
 Jacobowsky und der Oberst after the comedy  by Franz Werfel, 1965
 Ein wahrer Held after The Playboy of the Western World by John Millington Synge, 1975
 Das Mädchen aus Domrémy after the drama Die Jungfrau von Orléans by Friedrich Schiller, 1976
 Der Jüngste Tag after Ödön von Horváth, 1980
 Hugo Weisgall:
 Six Characters in Search of an Author after the drama Six Characters in Search of an Author by Luigi Pirandello, 1959
 Sylvano Bussotti
 Lorenzaccio after the drama Lorenzaccio by Alfred de Musset, 1972
 Le Racine after the drama Phèdre by Jean Racine, 1980
 Fedra after the drama Phèdre by Jean Racine, 1988
 Tieste after the drama Thyestes by Lucius Annaeus Seneca, 2000
 Aribert Reimann:
 Ein Traumspiel after August Strindberg’s drama Ett drömspel, 1964
 Melusine after Yvan Goll, 1970
 Lear after William Shakespeare’s drama King Lear, 1978
 Die Gespenstersonate after August Strindberg’s drama Spöksonaten, 1983
 Troades after the drama The Trojan Women by Euripides in the translation by Franz Werfel, 1985
 Das Schloß after Franz Kafka’s novel Das Schloß and its theatre version by Max Brod, 1991
 Bernarda Albas Haus after Federico García Lorca’s drama The House of Bernarda Alba, 2000
 Medea after the third part of Franz Grillparzer's trilogy , 2010
 L'Invisible (after Maurice Maeterlinck's L'Intruse, L'Intérieur and La Mort de Tintagiles), 2017
 Wolfgang Rihm:
 Faust und Yorick nach Jean Tardieu, 1977
 Walter Steffens:
 Eli after the mystery play by Nelly Sachs, 1967
 Unter dem Milchwald after Under Milk Wood by Dylan Thomas, 1973
 Adriana Hölszky:
 Bremer Freiheit after Rainer Werner Fassbinder, 1988
 Die Wände after the drama Les paravents by Jean Genet, 1995
 Michèle Reverdy, Le Précepteur after the play Der Hofmeister by Jakob Michael Reinhold Lenz, 1990
 Michael Denhoff: Der Pelikan after August Strindberg, 1992
 Manfred Trojahn: 
  Enrico after the drama Enrico IV by Luigi Pirandello, 1991
 Was ihr wollt after Shakespeare’s Twelfth Night, 1998
 Orest after the drama Orestes by Euripides, 2011
 Toshio Hosokawa
 Hanjo after the Nô-drama 班女 (Hanjo, 1955) by Yukio Mishima (三島 由紀夫) in a translation by Donald Keene, 2004
 Matsukaze, after the Nô-drama 松風 (Matsukaze) by Zeami Motokiyo (世阿弥 元清), 2011
 Luca Francesconi, Quartet after the drama Quartett by Heiner Müller, 2011
 Marc-André Dalbavie, Le Soulier de satin after the drama Le Soulier de satin (1931) by Paul Claudel, 2021

Literaturopern based on novels and short stories 
 Frederick Delius: A Village Romeo and Juliet after Gottfried Keller's Romeo und Julia auf dem Dorfe, 1907
 Leoš Janáček:
 Káťa Kabanová after Alexander Ostrovsky, 1921
 From the House of the Dead (Z mrtvého domu) after Fyodor Dostoevsky, 1930
 Dmitri Shostakovich:
 Нос (The Nose) after the comedy by Nikolai Gogol
 Леди Макбет Мценского уезда (Lady Macbeth of Mtsensk) after Nikolai Leskov's novel Ledy Macbeth Mtsenskovo uyezda, 1934
 Benjamin Britten:
 Billy Budd after Herman Melville, 1951
  Death in Venice after Thomas Mann's novel Tod in Venedig, 1973
 Gottfried von Einem: Der Prozess based on the novel  Der Process by Franz Kafka , 1953
 Giselher Klebe:
 Die tödlichen Wünsche after the novel La peau de chagrin von Honoré de Balzac, 1959
 Das Märchen von der schönen Lilie after Goethe, 1969
 Werner Egk: Die Verlobung in San Domingo after the novel  von Heinrich von Kleist, 1963
 Boris Blacher:
 Das Geheimnis des entwendeten Briefes after the novel The Purloined Letter by Edgar Allan Poe, 1975
 Die Flut nach einer Erzählung von Guy de Maupassant, 1947
 Hans Werner Henze:
 Ein Landarzt, radio opera after Franz Kafka, 1951
 Boulevard Solitude after the novel Histoire du Chevalier Des Grieux et de Manon Lescaut by Abbé Prévost, 1952
 Der junge Lord based on the short story Der Affe als Mensch by Wilhelm Hauff, 1965
 Pollicino based on a fairytale by Charles Perrault, 1980
 Das verratene Meer, after Yukio Mishima's The Sailor Who Fell from Grace with the Sea (午後の曳航 – Gogo no Eiko), 1986–89
 Wolfgang Rihm:
  Jakob Lenz after the novella Lenz by Georg Büchner, 1979
  Die Hamletmaschine  based on Heiner Müller's text Die Hamletmaschine (1977), 1987
  Die Eroberung von Mexico based on Antonin Artaud's 1932 texts La conquête du Mexique and Le théâtre de Séraphin, 1992
  Dionysos based on Friedrich Nietzsche's Dionysian-Dithyrambs, 2010
 Aribert Reimann: Das Schloß after Franz Kafka’s novel Das Schloß and its theatre version by Max Brod, 1991
 Hans Zender: Don Quijote de la Mancha after Miguel de Cervantes, 1993
Heinz Holliger: Schneewittchen after Robert Walser, 1998

References

Bibliography
 Vincenzo Borghetti/Riccardo Pecci, Il bacio della sfinge. D'Annunzio, Pizzetti e »Fedra«, EDT, Torino 1998.
 Literaturoper by Julian Budden, in 'The New Grove Dictionary of Opera', ed. Stanley Sadie (London, 1992) 
 Carl Dahlhaus: Vom Musikdrama zur Literaturoper. Aufsätze zur neueren Operngeschichte. Überarbeitete Neuausgabe. Piper u. a., München u. a. 1989,  (Serie Piper 8238).
 Swantje Gostomzyk: Literaturoper am Ende des 20. Jahrhunderts. Eine interdisziplinäre Studie am Beispiel der Opern von Detlev Glanert. Lang, Frankfurt am Main 2009.
 Adriana Guarnieri Corazzol, Musica e letteratura in Italia tra Ottocento e Novecento, Sansoni, Milano 2000.
 Hugh Macdonald: The Prose Libretto, In: Cambridge Opera Journal 1, 1989, pp. 155–166.
 Jürgen Maehder: The Origins of Italian »Literaturoper« ─ »Guglielmo Ratcliff«, »La figlia di Iorio«, »Parisina« and »Francesca da Rimini«, in: Arthur Groos/Roger Parker (edd.), Reading Opera, Princeton University Press, Princeton 1988, pp. 92–128.
 Jürgen Maehder: Drammaturgia musicale e strutture narrative nel teatro musicale italiano della generazaione dell'Ottanta, in: Mila De Santis (ed.), Alfredo Casella e l'Europa. Atti del Convegno internazionale di Studi a Siena, 7-9 giugno 2001, Olschki, Firenze 2003, pp. 223–248.
 Jürgen Maehder: »Salome« von Oscar Wilde und Richard Strauss ─ Die Entstehungsbedingungen der sinfonischen Literaturoper des Fin de siècle, in: Jürgen Kühnel/Ulrich Müller/Sigrid Schmidt (edd.), Richard Strauss, »Salome«: Stofftraditionen, Text und Musik,  Müller-Speiser Anif/Salzburg 2013, pp. 55–107.
 Peter Petersen: Der Terminus „Literaturoper“ – eine Begriffsbestimmung. In: Archiv für Musikwissenschaft 56, 1999, pp. 52–70.
 Olaf Roth: Die Opernlibretti nach Dramen d'Annunzios, Peter Lang, Bern/Frankfurt/New York 1999.
 Richard Taruskin: Realism as Preached and Practiced – The Russian Opera Dialogue. In: Musical Quarterly, 56, 1970.
 Jürg Stenzl: Heinrich von Kleists Penthesilea in der Vertonung von Ottmar Schoeck. In Günter Schnitzler (Hrsg.): Dichtung und Musik – Kaleidoskop ihrer Beziehungen. Klett-Cotta, 1979, p. 224 sqq.
 Almut Ullrich: Die „Literaturoper“ von 1970–1990. Texte und Tendenzen. Noetzel, Wilhelmshaven 1991,  (Veröffentlichungen zur Musikforschung 11).
 Sigrid Wiesmann (ed.): Für und Wider die Literaturoper. Zur Situation nach 1945. Laaber-Verlag, Laaber 1982,  (Thurnauer Schriften zum Musiktheater'' 6).

Opera genres
Opera terminology
German words and phrases